The Ministry of Love is one of the ministries in George Orwell's novel Nineteen Eighty-Four.

It may also refer to:

 Ministry of Love (album) by Io Echo
 Ministry of Love (film), Croatian film